Juan Pablo Montoya Roldán (born September 20, 1975) is a Colombian racing driver.

He won the International F3000 championship in 1998, the CART FedEx Championship Series in 1999 in his debut year in the series, and the IMSA WeatherTech SportsCar Championship in 2019. His race wins include the Indianapolis 500 (2000, 2015), Monaco Grand Prix (2003), 24 Hours of Daytona (2007, 2008, 2013), British Grand Prix (2005), Italian Grand Prix (2001, 2005), Grand Prix of Long Beach (1999), and the Race of Champions (2017). Montoya is, alongside Fernando Alonso, one of only two active drivers who have won two legs of the Triple Crown of Motorsport in its more recent definition. Montoya is one of three drivers, along with Mario Andretti and Dan Gurney, to win at least one race in Indy car racing, Formula One, and the NASCAR Cup Series.

In October 2009, Montoya was ranked 30th on Times Onlines list of the Top 50 Formula One drivers of all time.

Early career
Montoya was born in Bogotá, Colombia, where he was taught the techniques of karting from an early age by his father Pablo, an architect and motorsport enthusiast.

Montoya moved to the Colombian Formula Renault Series in 1992, while racing there he won four of eight races and had five poles. The same year he also participated in the U.S. Skip Barber driving school, and was hailed by driving instructors as being one of the best pupils to ever come through their school.  1993 saw Montoya switch to the Swift GTI Championship, a series he dominated by winning seven of eight races and earning eight poles.  In 1994, Montoya raced in three separate series: The Sudam 125 Karting (won the title), Barber Saab Pro Series (finished third in points, won two races), and Formula N in Mexico (won the title).  He graduated from the Colegio San Tarsicio in Bogotá in the same year.  Montoya developed into a strong qualifier, in some cases taking 80% of a season's pole positions. For the next three years Montoya raced in various divisions, continually progressing upward.  He raced in the 1995 British Formula Vauxhall Championship, winning three races and finishing third in the championship. In 1996, he raced in the British Formula 3 with Fortec Motorsport, winning two races, and finishing 5th in the championship points standings, as well as taking part in events in Zandvoort, Netherlands and Silverstone.

F3000 career – F1 testing

1997
Montoya got the opportunity to advance in his motor racing career when he was hired by the RSM Marko team to compete alongside Craig Lowndes in the 1997 International Formula 3000 season. In the ten races during the season, Montoya had three wins and three pole positions. He finished his rookie season second in the championship points standings, just 1.5 points shy of taking the overall season title. During this time, Williams noticed his potential and invited him to test with the team at Barcelona, Spain along with three other drivers. Montoya was the fastest of them all and he and Max Wilson were signed by WilliamsF1 to be test drivers for the following season.

1998
Alongside his Formula One testing duties for Williams, he competed again in F3000 and took the title in a close contest with Nick Heidfeld who was driving for McLaren's F3000 team. During the 1998 F3000 season, Montoya opened the season up with a record four straight pole positions. He also achieved another record that year by being the first driver to lap the entire grid, at the Pau Grand Prix. Montoya won the 1998 F3000 season with four wins, seven pole positions, and nine podium finishes in twelve races.

CART career

1999
Renault, Williams's engine supplier for most of the 1990s, left Formula One at the end of the 1997 season. With no major engine suppliers available, Williams were forced to sign a contract to run customer engines for the 1998 and 1999 seasons. In 1998 the team failed to win a race for the first time in a decade. For the 1999 season, in the hope of attracting more investors to the underperforming team, Frank Williams agreed to a driver swap with CART team owner Chip Ganassi, in which Ganassi's 1997 and 1998 CART champion driver, Alex Zanardi, would return to Formula One and Montoya would take his place in the competitive American series.

While Zanardi had a miserable year in Formula One, Montoya, with Honda power and a Reynard chassis at his disposal, took the American motorsport scene by storm. He took the 1999 title in his rookie year, something accomplished six years earlier by former Formula One Champion Nigel Mansell.

The season that saw Montoya crowned as the youngest ever CART FedEx Championship Series Champion at the age of 24 was closely fought, especially with Dario Franchitti who led the championship going into the final race in California. Both drivers finished the season with equal number of points but Montoya took the title by virtue of having won seven races to the Scotsman's three.  His victory in the last race that year, the Marlboro 500, was overshadowed by the death of Greg Moore during the race; Montoya first heard the news after parking his car in victory lane and was seen sobbing.

The CART rookie attracted criticism—notably from Michael Andretti and his team for his aggressive style of driving.

Montoya still had a contractual relationship with Williams and after his impressive rookie season the Grove-based team were keen for him to drive for them in Formula One. However, he decided to race in the US for one more year.

2000
In 2000, the Ganassi team switched to Toyota engines and Lola chassis. The package was strong for ovals and high speed tracks, but was less well suited to street and most road circuits. Toyota's engines were not yet reliable and often failed the team. Despite this, Montoya led more laps than anyone else and took the maiden victory for a Toyota engine in the series. But he failed to finish in 40% of the races, and was out of contention for the championship.

The Ganassi team also competed in the 2000 Indianapolis 500 of the rival Indy Racing League series using a G-Force chassis and a Comptech-tuned Oldsmobile Aurora engine. Montoya and his CART teammate Jimmy Vasser were the first CART drivers to "cross-over" to drive in the Indy 500 since 1996. In the event, the Colombian led 167 of 200 laps and claimed top honours at the end of the  race, taking an easy victory on his first attempt. He was the first to do so since Formula One World Champion Graham Hill in 1966 and was the first Colombian winner. His compatriot Roberto José Guerrero had previously finished twice as runner up.

Montoya won the Miller Lite 225 the next week at The Milwaukee Mile. That victory marked his eighth and Toyota's first win in the CART (later Champ Car World Series) series.

Formula One career
Over the weekend of the 2000 United States Grand Prix, Williams-BMW announced a two-year deal for Montoya to partner Ralf Schumacher starting in 2001. During the first half of his Formula One career, he consolidated his position as a fast driver and a race win challenger; Montoya became a title contender during 2003 but the hopes of fighting for the title gradually faded as his cars lacked pace.

Montoya was voted top Latin American driver at the Premios Fox Sports awards in 2003 and 2005.

Williams (2001–2004)

2001
Montoya made his Formula One debut for the BMW-powered Williams team in the 2001 Formula One season at the Australian Grand Prix. In that race, he qualified 11th and went off in the first corner and went further down the order but, with a good drive and a high rate of retirements, he went up to fifth until he retired with an engine failure.

The second round was the Malaysian Grand Prix and Montoya qualified better in sixth place but stalled on the grid and had to start from the back. He only lasted for three laps before retiring after spinning off in a rain shower.

In his third race, the Brazilian Grand Prix, he qualified in fourth place. He got up to second on the first lap and there was a safety car due to an incident in the first corner. On the restart, which was on the third lap, Montoya passed World Champion Michael Schumacher into the first corner. He held off Schumacher, who was on a two-stop strategy compared to Montoya's one stop strategy until Schumacher's first stop. Montoya now seemed to have the race in his pocket as he had a five-second advantage over eventual winner David Coulthard. However, while he was lapping Jos Verstappen, the Dutchman accidentally rammed into the back of him, taking Montoya out.

After his performance in Brazil, expectations were high going into the fourth round, the San Marino Grand Prix. Montoya qualified in seventh, and was well set for points in the race but more bad luck, this time due to a brake failure which took him out of fifth place, leaving him without a point after four races.

Round 5 was the Spanish Grand Prix and Montoya needed a good result but did not look like getting it, so, after another poor qualifying, Montoya found himself down in 12th place. He made up for it by making a quick start by gaining five places and was up to sixth in the first corner (David Coulthard was starting from the back of the grid after stalling on the formation lap). He got ahead of Jacques Villeneuve in the second round of pit stops. He stayed on the track and climbed up to second due to a high attrition rate.

In the next race, the Austrian Grand Prix, Montoya finally outpaced his teammate Ralf Schumacher in qualifying and took a career-best second. It looked better and better for him as he took the lead at the start and pulled away, with second-placed Ralf holding up a string of five cars behind him. But, after 10 laps, Ralf retired with brake failure. Montoya was struggling with the same problems, and Schumacher had been told to hold the others up so that Montoya could build a gap. With Ralf Schumacher out, the five drivers, led by Michael Schumacher began to close on Montoya at over a second a lap. Soon, Michael was right on Montoya's tail and tried to pass him around the outside at Remus Curve. Montoya kept on the inside, braked late, locked up and went to the gravel. Schumacher was also forced to go to the gravel to avoid Montoya. Montoya rejoined seventh, just behind Schumacher. Montoya went for an early stop which solved his problems. He was set for one point in sixth until he stopped on the track with a hydraulic failure. After the race, Schumacher said that 'all Montoya was doing was to try to take Schumacher out with himself off the circuit'.

In the Monaco Grand Prix, Montoya did not reproduce his previous form and had to be satisfied with qualifying seventh. In the race, he made one position at the start. He then tried to pressure teammate Ralf Schumacher to make a mistake, but it was he himself who made the mistake, by sliding into the barriers on the Swimming Pool section on lap 3. That was the end of the race for him.

Montoya went into the Canadian Grand Prix desperately needing some points, after having had only 6 points from seven races. His qualifying did not help the cause at all though, as he qualified way down in 10th. He gained one place at the first corner but then could not keep the pace of the cars in front. He came under pressure from a charging Rubens Barrichello, and pushed his car too hard and retired after crashing into a wall while trying to both fend off Barrichello and catch up with the cars in front.

The ninth round of the season was the European Grand Prix and Montoya held pole for most of qualifying only for both Michael and Ralf Schumacher to bump him down to third in the final seconds. At the start of the race, he kept third and ran three seconds behind the two leaders. After the first round of stops, the two leaders came ahead of the one-stopping David Coulthard but Montoya came behind. He was stuck there for five laps and it cost him three seconds. He was forced to settle for third and that became second when Ralf was given a ten-second, stop-and-go penalty for a pitlane infringement. Montoya finished in second, and the result gave him more confidence than ever.

Montoya only finished six races, but he nevertheless won three pole positions and stood on the podium four times, including his maiden Formula One victory at the 2001 Italian Grand Prix at Monza. Overall, he finished the season in 6th position in the Drivers' Championship.

2002
In the 2002 Formula One season, Montoya was the best of the rest as Ferrari's dominance left available no better place than third. Schumacher and Rubens Barrichello won 15 of 17 races. Although he did not win a race, unlike Coulthard and his teammate Ralf Schumacher, Montoya was one of the few drivers to compete with Schumacher on the track. As in 2001, he stood out for his forceful overtaking moves on the World Champion, although several times he lost places through clashing with the German. For qualifying, the BMW WilliamsF1 FW24 could be set up to use its tires more effectively than its rivals and generate more grip. With this weapon, Montoya was able to achieve seven pole positions, usually setting his pole time in the very last seconds of the session. He set the fastest-ever average speed over a lap (259.83 km/h) during the qualifying session of the 2002 Italian Grand Prix at Monza. Overall, he finished the season in 3rd position in the Drivers' Championship.

2003

Although the 2003 chassis was built by the team specifically for Montoya's driving style, the machine needed time to be developed. Problems with oversteer were still present, often resulting in 360° spins in front of the crowd, in addition to reliability problems with the BMW engine.

From the Monaco Grand Prix, the FW25 proved to be the class of the field, allowing Montoya to take victory at Circuit de Monaco from Kimi Räikkönen, joining Graham Hill as the only winners of both the Monaco GP and the Indy 500. McLaren announced that they would take on Montoya's racing services from 2005 at an end of season announcement, although it was believed that he had already decided to leave immediately after the French GP.

Bad luck for rivals and excellent on-track performances from the Colombian meant he was a title contender, particularly after a key victory at the German Grand Prix. Williams, however, were unable to keep pace with the latest developments from Ferrari, coupled with a mid-season amendment to tyre regulations that forced the Michelin-shod Williams, among others, to quickly make a new design to avoid being disqualified. With that, the Bridgestone-shod Ferraris returned to form. Montoya failed to claim another victory that year. A drive-through penalty at the United States Grand Prix after a collision with Ferrari's Barrichello ended his title chances in the last race he would finish in 2003. He was leading the final race of the season in Japan when he had a hydraulic failure. Overall, he finished the season in 3rd position in the Drivers' Championship.

2004
2004 was a disappointing year for Montoya. His relationship with the team was strained throughout the season since both parties knew he would be leaving for the McLaren team at the end of the year.

Early season promise faded as the radical looking 'tusked' Williams FW26 initially lacked pace and both drivers were frequently left struggling to score points. However, the car was significantly overhauled during the season and the radical nose designed by a former Ferrari aerodynamicist was finally replaced with a more conventional one for the final stages of the season. Montoya left the team on a high note by winning his last race with them, the 2004 Brazilian Grand Prix, which was closely contested with future McLaren teammate Kimi Räikkönen. Overall, he finished the season in 5th position in the Drivers' Championship.

Montoya would later purchase his race winning FW26 chassis from Frank Williams but claims that BMW refused to sell him an engine.

McLaren (2005–2006)

2005
After driving for Williams for four full seasons, Montoya found the McLaren Mercedes car unpredictable, often claiming it felt like the steering wheel was not "attached" to the rest of the car.

Criticised in previous years for his lack of fitness Montoya began a training program under the direction of McLaren personnel however all the effort was lost when after the Malaysian Grand Prix he injured his shoulder playing tennis, with reserve drivers Pedro de la Rosa and Alexander Wurz temporarily replacing him. There is some discrepancy about the injury, as Adrian Newey stated that Montoya "rather disgraced himself by breaking his ankle 'playing tennis' after the second race in Malaysia."

In practice for the Monaco Grand Prix Montoya was penalized to start from the back by race stewards for brake-testing his former Williams teammate, Ralf Schumacher, causing a four car collision. At the Canadian Grand Prix Montoya was in contention for the win, but he was disqualified after leaving the pitlane under a red light. As a Michelin runner, Montoya did not start the US Grand Prix (see 2005 US Grand Prix). The Colombian was on track for a possible podium finish at Magny-Cours when his hydraulics failed. He retired from the lead of the Hungarian GP due to a broken driveshaft. His teammate had a similar failure eight races earlier, which showed the differences in suspension geometry between both McLarens as the torsional forces are carried out in different manner.

During the year Montoya suffered even more from oversteer than he had at Williams. On several occasions he spun during practice. More seriously he spun in his return from injury at the Spanish Grand Prix and most notoriously at the last corner during qualifying for the German Grand Prix. On that occasion he made up for it by climbing from 20th to 8th after the first two corners eventually finishing in a respectable 2nd.

Montoya worked with the team during the year to identify suspension geometry and aerodynamic problems that were making the car unpredictable.

For most of the season Montoya's major concerns were the ongoing problems with backmarkers. Both Tiago Monteiro and Antônio Pizzonia collided with him, as had Jos Verstappen in 2001, and Jacques Villeneuve forced him off the track in one of the final races of the year. These incidents prevented Montoya from completing his main task for the team; stopping Fernando Alonso and Renault F1 from increasing their lead in the standings.

In the final stages of the season it was clear that Montoya and his car were finally adapted to one another. The Colombian has often attributed this to the greater effort made by the McLaren team than by Williams to tune the car to his driving style. In the last 7 Grands Prix Montoya finished, he scored 3 wins, 2 poles and 5 podiums, as well as set a track record (fastest lap) of 1:24.770, which still stands today, at the 2005 Turkish Grand Prix. At the Brazilian GP, Montoya led home McLaren's first 1–2 result in years, ahead of newly crowned world champion Fernando Alonso in third, it was his last finish of the year. In Japan he was forced off the track by Jacques Villeneuve on lap one, while in China a loose drain cover rose up and hit his car, damaging the engine. Overall, he finished the season in 4th position in the Drivers' Championship.

2006
Montoya started his  season learning that the  F1 Champion Fernando Alonso had been contracted by McLaren for the  season. At the same time McLaren did not take up their option on Montoya for 2007, while his teammate Kimi Räikkönen remained a free agent, although it was later revealed that Räikkönen had already signed with Ferrari for 2007 by the time Alonso had signed with McLaren for 2007.

During the first three races, Montoya consistently underperformed on the track, not managing to improve his position from the start at the Bahrain and Malaysia Grands Prix. Problems with his engine mapping also contributed, resulting in poor straight line performance. His car spun near the end of the warm-up lap, caused by too much throttle while warming the tyres, and if Giancarlo Fisichella had not stalled his Renault before the start of the race and triggered another formation lap, Montoya would have started at the back end of the grid. He did manage to regain his grid position though, which angered other team managers. His race ended when towards the end of the race he hit a kerb on the exit of the final corner, while chasing Ralf Schumacher hard for third place. The impact triggered an automatic electronic device in the McLaren MP4-21, shutting down his engine as it went into safety mode.

McLaren fitted his engine into the team spare car, thus saving Montoya from a 10-place grid penalty. He managed to qualify in seventh place ahead of Räikkönen. The race however was very undramatic for him and a steady performance saw him finish third, earning his first podium finish of the season.

The races at the Nürburgring and the Circuit de Catalunya, however, were very disappointing for Montoya. He qualified in 9th position for the  but then was stuck behind traffic for almost the whole race before his engine failed a few laps from the end. Catalunya saw Montoya failing to qualify in the top 10 for the first time in the season. He qualified 12th in an underperforming McLaren. He was heavily fuelled and was on a one-stop strategy for the race but he spun and his car got stuck on a kerb and his race was over. Montoya had a solid race at Monaco, inheriting second place 14.5 seconds behind championship leader Fernando Alonso after Räikkönen and Mark Webber went out with engine problems on lap 50. Once again, though, he appeared to be somewhat off his teammate's pace.

The  saw Montoya pull off a stunning overtaking move on Michael Schumacher on the opening lap, but contact with Nico Rosberg on the next lap and a mistake at the last corner resulted in Montoya hitting the wall and damaging the car, leading to retirement. The  also brought further disappointment to Montoya's season. An 8-car crash on the first corner saw him retire from the race, yet again taking no points. This crash also involved teammate Räikkönen, and as one of the main instigators of the crash thanks to his and Räikkönen's impact being seen as the initial cause of the crash, this cast further doubt upon Montoya's future in Formula One.

Montoya's Formula One career effectively came to an end on July 9 when he announced in a public press conference from the US that he had signed a contract to run in the NASCAR series from 2007. On July 11, 2006, McLaren announced that Montoya would stop racing for the team with immediate effect. This ultimately confirmed Montoya's exit from F1. However, in the press conference on July 14 at the French Grand Prix, Ron Dennis stated that Montoya was still under contract with McLaren and he would remain in contract with the team until the expiration of the deal. Following further speculation that he could start racing in the NASCAR series as early as 2006, Dennis publicly offered Montoya an early exit from his contract with McLaren, provided that he resigned from receiving any payout to terminate his contract. Overall, he finished the season in 8th position in the Drivers' Championship.

NASCAR

2006 season

On July 9, 2006, Montoya announced his plans to compete in the NASCAR Nextel Cup series beginning with the 2007 season, racing for Chip Ganassi and Felix Sabates's NASCAR operation, Chip Ganassi Racing, in the No. 42 Texaco/Havoline-sponsored car. "I'm looking forward to racing in the Nextel Cup Series for Chip Ganassi in the Big Red Car.  I think I will learn a lot from my teammates and other drivers around me. It will be tough though to get used to the difference in the cars." Montoya made his stock car debut in an Automobile Racing Club of America (ARCA) event at the Talladega Superspeedway on October 6, 2006. He qualified second, led the first nine laps, and finished third when the race was called after 79 of 92 laps. Three weeks later he followed this with an 11th-place finish after a mid-race spin at the Sam's Town 250 at Memphis Motorsports Park, his first appearance in NASCAR's second division Busch Series. He competed in the final three races of the Busch Series season, but did not better this performance. He would later run 17 Busch Series races on a part-time schedule the following year. On November 19, 2006, Montoya competed for the first time in NASCAR's premier division, the NEXTEL Cup Series. He qualified 29th in the No. 30 Texaco car at the Ford 400 at Homestead-Miami Speedway. He was running just outside the top 10 when contact with Ryan Newman ended his race on lap 251. His car ended up in the grass engulfed in flames due to his fuel cell erupting during the crash and he was credited with a 34th-place finish. Finished 71st in series points.

2007 season

Montoya visited victory lane three times across three different racing series in 2007. He kicked off 2007 with a win in his first Rolex 24 at Daytona race in the Grand American Road Racing Association. Then, in just his seventh-career Nationwide Series race, Montoya took the checkered flag in Mexico City to earn his first win in a stock car. His abilities on the road course were evident to his competitors when he captured his first Sprint Cup victory after qualifying 32nd at Infineon Raceway. Montoya and his No. 42 crew went on to amass one win, three top-five and six top-10 finishes during the 2007 Sprint Cup season. Montoya also earned the honor of NASCAR Sprint Cup Series 2007 Rookie of the Year and finished 20th in series points.

2008 season

In 2008, Montoya and the No. 42 team amassed two top-five, three top-10 and seven top-15 finishes which include a runner-up finish at Talladega Superspeedway. In addition, Montoya became the first driver in history to win in his first two starts in the Rolex 24 at Daytona, which he won with teammates Scott Pruett, Memo Rojas and Dario Franchitti.
Montoya ended the season 25th in the points standings, 5 spots lower than in 2007.
On November 14, it was announced the Ganassi team would merge with Dale Earnhardt Inc., Montoya was confirmed to drive the No. 42 as the team switches from Dodge to Chevrolet.

2009: Only Chase Appearance
It was announced in January that Target would take over as Montoya's primary sponsor for the 2009 Cup season.

Montoya ran in the Rolex 24 Hours of Daytona and finished second after a thrilling duel with David Donohue. Montoya's Lexus did not have the speed that Donohue had in the Porsche he was driving, and when Montoya was slowed by lap traffic in the chicane, Donohue was able to pass Montoya and hold him off to take the victory, denying Montoya what would have been his third straight 24-hour win.  The margin of victory in the 2009 Rolex 24 Hours of Daytona was 0.167 seconds, making it the closest finish in Rolex 24 Hour history.

Montoya finished 14th in the Daytona 500 and finished 11th at Auto Club Speedway.

On April 25, he won his first career pole at the Aaron's 499 at Talladega. After going a lap down Montoya finished 8th at the Pocono 500 at Pocono Raceway. He followed this up a week later with a 6th place at the Lifelock 400 at Michigan International Speedway. After racing in the top-10 all day, Montoya got his third top 10 in a row with a 6th place at the Toyota/Save Mart 350 at Infineon Raceway in Sonoma. Montoya got his best ever finish at Daytona International Speedway in the Coke Zero 400 where after going a lap down twice he battled back to 9th.
Montoya dominated the Allstate 400 at the Brickyard in Indianapolis on July 26 after starting from second position. It was the first time in his NASCAR career that he scored bonus points for leading the most laps in the event, however, he was penalized with a drive-through penalty after his last pit stop for speeding in the pit lane. His healthy 5-second advantage over the rest of the field was gone and he ended up finishing 11th. After a pit lane error Montoya slipped back from his top-10 spot at the Sunoco Red Cross Pennsylvania 500 at Pocono Raceway. However, a good pit call meant Montoya pitted prior to a caution which meant he started the next restart in 4th. After slipping back to 5th he made up good ground to pass Bowyer for 2nd. He went after the leader, Denny Hamlin but could not catch him. The second-place finish was his first top 5 of the year and joint best on an oval. At the Carfax 400 at Michigan, Montoya posted the 3rd quickest qualifying time just 0.087 seconds off of the pole. In the race Montoya gradually slipped back and grew frustrated with crew chief Brian Pattie as the car was getting tighter and tighter, Kasey Kahne and Montoya made contact when the 9 car got loose and its splitter touched the 42's right rear tire. The contact resulted in Montoya's right rear going flat and he lost a lap on pit road fixing the minor body damage. However he shortly got the lucky dog and raced up to 20th before dropping back to 23rd, Montoya gained 4 positions on the last lap as others ran out of fuel, resulting in a 19th-place finish which at least kept Juan 7th in points.

Montoya finished the first 26 races in eighth place in the standings, which made him the first foreign born driver to qualify for the Chase for the Sprint Cup. He began the Chase in 11th place after reseeding, and was placed as high as 3rd during the Chase before finishing the year in eighth place.

2010 season
Montoya ran in the Rolex 24 Hours of Daytona for Chip Ganassi in the No. 02 Chip Ganassi Racing with Felix Sabates BMW Riley with NASCAR teammate Jamie McMurray and Indycar champions Scott Dixon and Dario Franchitti. Montoya reunited with his old engine manufacturer BMW when Montoya drove WilliamsF1 in 2001–2004. The team led for around four hours and completed 249 laps. However, the car was forced to retire after 8:29:58 due to an engine failure, robbing the team of a potential victory. The Ganassi No. 01 entry then took the lead before Action Express Racing ultimately took the checkered flag.

Montoya began his NASCAR season with Daytona Speedweeks; the first race was the Bud Shootout exhibition race in which he finished 10th. Montoya had earlier posted the fifth fastest time in Daytona 500 qualifying but the unique qualifying system during Speedweeks meant Montoya would start P2 in the 2nd Gatorade Duel on Thursday the 11th to race for starting position in the Daytona 500 on the 14th.

Montoya started the 2010 edition of the Watkins Glen race in 3rd place and led 74 of the 90 laps to win his 2nd career Sprint Cup Series race. This made him the first foreign-born driver to have multiple wins in NASCAR Sprint Cup history. Montoya did not make the Chase for the Sprint Cup and ended up 17th in points with six top-fives and fourteen top-tens. Montoya also won the pole for the Lenox Industrial Tools 301, the Brickyard 400, and the AMP Energy Juice 500.

2011 season
The 2011 season started well for Montoya. Montoya, Scott Dixon, Dario Franchitti, and Jamie McMurray drove the No. 02 Chip Ganassi Racing BMW Riley to start 5th and finish 2nd in the Rolex 24 Hours of Daytona. The No. 02 team finished behind their teammates driving the No. 01 Chip Ganassi Racing BMW Riley.

Montoya started the 2011 NASCAR season on a high note finishing 6th in the Daytona 500 and 5th in points. He was involved in two wrecks, both involving Jamie McMurray, his teammate. No serious damage occurred to either of the cars; they both ended up in the top ten. Two weeks later in the Kobalt Tools 400 at Las Vegas Motor Speedway, Montoya, in a blue Clorox scheme led seven laps and finished 3rd. Montoya won the pole for the Auto Club 400 and the Crown Royal 400. It was announced that his crew chief since mid-2008, Brian Pattie, would be replaced by Jim Pohlman.

2012 season

Montoya re-signed with Earnhardt Ganassi Racing to remain in the No. 42 car in the Sprint Cup Series in 2012.

During a caution period on lap 160 of the 2012 Daytona 500, a defective rear suspension on his No. 42 Chevrolet inexplicably collapsed, sending Montoya careening into a track support vehicle towing a jet dryer. Leaking vapor from the dryer caught fire and led to a lengthy red flag. The driver of the support vehicle and Montoya were both cleared medically after the accident.

The 2012 season was the second-worst in Montoya's Sprint Cup career, in which he finished 22nd in points with 5 DNF's. The only headlines he captured were back-to-back poles in the Pennsylvania 400 in Pocono Raceway and the Finger Lakes 355 at The Glen at Watkins Glen International, along with two of 8th-place finishes in the Food City 500 at Bristol Motor Speedway and the Quicken Loans 400 at Michigan International Speedway.

Montoya also ran two Grand-Am Rolex Sports Car Series races in the BMW-powered No.02 for Chip Ganassi Racing—the Rolex 24 Hours of Daytona and the Brickyard Grand Prix at Indianapolis Motor Speedway, as part of Super Weekend at the Brickyard, finishing in fourth place in both events.

2013 season

Montoya began the 2013 season becoming NASCAR's first and only driver ever to score three 24 Hour of Daytona victories, co-piloting Chip Ganassi Racing's Riley-BMW to first place overall, in the Rolex 24 Hours of Daytona on January 26–27.

In the Toyota Owners 400 at Richmond International Raceway, Montoya almost scored his first career Sprint Cup Series oval-track win, but finished fourth due to an untimely caution coming out with three laps to go (caused by Brian Vickers crashing). He also nearly won Dover but ended up being passed by Tony Stewart with three laps remaining. In the Toyota/Save Mart 350 at Sonoma Raceway, Montoya was in second place behind eventual race winner Martin Truex Jr., but ran out of fuel on the final lap and dropped 32 positions, finishing 34th.

On August 13, 2013, it was announced that Montoya's contract with Earnhardt Ganassi Racing would not be renewed for the 2014 season. He would be replaced by Kyle Larson.

2014 season
Montoya raced twice in 2014 for Team Penske in between his IndyCar commitments, finishing 18th at Michigan and 23rd at Indianapolis.

Return to IndyCar
On September 16, 2013, it was announced for the 2014 racing season Montoya would compete in the IndyCar Series, driving the No. 2 Dallara-Chevrolet for Team Penske.

2014 season
On May 10, 2014, Montoya raced in the 2014 Grand Prix of Indianapolis, which was the fifth different race Montoya had competed in at the Indianapolis Motor Speedway, a record. 
On May 25, 2014, Montoya raced in the 2014 Indianapolis 500 and finished in 5th place.  He had started at 10th in the race after having a good second-day of qualifying, and was spotted by Derek Higgins, the 2-time champion of the Mexican Formula 3.  On July 6, 2014, Montoya won the Pocono IndyCar 500.  This was his first IndyCar race win since 2000, when he won the Indianapolis 500. Montoya also set the record for the "Fastest 500 Mile Race in Motorsports History" with his win at Pocono Raceway. The average speed was 202.402 mph.

2015 season

Montoya won the opening race of the season at Grand Prix of St. Petersburg, then finished on the podium again at the Angie's List Grand Prix of Indianapolis and Toyota Grand Prix of Long Beach, 5th in the Grand Prix of Louisiana, and on May 24, 2015, Montoya passed his teammate Will Power with four laps to go to win the 2015 Indianapolis 500. He finished 2nd in the title standings to Scott Dixon on a count back much like the way he won the 1999 CART title from Dario Franchitti.

2016 season
Montoya once again won the opening race of the season at Grand Prix of St. Petersburg. Montoya passed Conor Daly on a restart at Lap 64 of the 110 lap race, and took the victory over his teammate Simon Pagenaud. During the remainder of the year Montoya took two further podium finishes and finished the season in eighth position in the championship.

After the end of the season, Penske informed Montoya that he was to be replaced in the team's full-time driver line-up by Josef Newgarden. Montoya and Penske did however reach a one-race deal that would allow Montoya to compete in the 2017 Indianapolis 500 for Penske.

2017 season
After more than 6 months of absence, Montoya returned with Penske for the IndyCar Grand Prix and the Indianapolis 500, in which he finished in the 6th position being the second best pilot of the Penske Team after Hélio Castroneves. Weeks after the race it was confirmed that Montoya and Oriol Servia will be the test pilots for the 2018 IndyCar new aerodynamic kits.

2021 season
Montoya made a brief return to IndyCar with Arrow McLaren SP in the 2021 season, finishing 21st in the Grand Prix of Indianapolis and 9th in the 2021 Indianapolis 500.

2022 season
It was confirmed near the beginning of 2022, that Montoya would again compete with Arrow McLaren SP in the 2022 Grand Prix of Indianpolis and the 2022 Indianpolis 500. He finished 24th and 11th in both races, respectively.

IMSA career
During the 2016 season, it was reported that Team Penske was looking at returning to top-level North American sports car racing in the International Motor Sports Association (IMSA) WeatherTech SportsCar Championship, and that Montoya would be the team's lead driver. In 2017 it was confirmed that Montoya would partner with former Prototype champion Dane Cameron in a Team Penske-run Acura ARX-05 Daytona Prototype international starting with the 2018 Rolex 24 at Daytona. Montoya teamed with Helio Castroneves and Simon Pagenaud at the 2017 Petit Le Mans in a stock Oreca 07-Gibson, scoring a podium in what was described as a "dress rehearsal" for the team prior to the 2018 season.

2017 season
Acura Team Penske made their IMSA debut at the last race of the season, the Petit Le Mans at Road Atlanta. Montoya teamed with Helio Castroneves and Simon Pagenaud in an Oreca 07-Gibson LMP2 car which took pole position and finished in third place.

2018 season

For the 2018 IMSA season Montoya officially partnered Dane Cameron in the No. 6 Acura Team Penske entry. Montoya's first podium of the 2018 IMSA season came at Mid-Ohio, where Montoya and Cameron finished 2nd place to Castroneves and Taylor. The Montoya/Cameron duo would score three more podiums at Belle Isle, Watkins Glen, and Laguna Seca that season. Their season ended with a 5th place in the drivers championship standings with four total podiums and a 2nd place as their best result out of 10 races.

Montoya would also make his first appearance at the 24 Hours of Le Mans in 2018. Montoya along with ex-F1 driver Paul di Resta were drafted into United Autosports to contest the race in two separate LMP2 entries. Montoya shared his seat in the No. 32 Ligier JSP217 with Hugo de Sadeleer and Will Owen. During the race, Montoya locked-up under braking and crashed at Indianapolis corner during one of his stints. The team was able to recover the car, replace the front fascia, and continue racing after re-joining two laps down. Benefiting from post-race penalties to cars ahead in-class, Montoya and his co-drivers were later elevated to the podium with a third-place in the LMP2 class and a seventh-place overall finish.

2019 season
In 2019 Montoya and Cameron began the IMSA season with improved but modest finishes at Daytona and Sebring, but began to bounce back harder during the shorter races in the season. They were able to podium at Long Beach with 3rd place, and took the No. 6 car's maiden win at Mid-Ohio in dominant fashion. Every race from Long Beach to Laguna Seca would see the No. 6 duo of Montoya and Cameron on the podium. They were able to enter the 2019 Petit Le Mans at Road Atlanta season finale with a points advantage and secured the IMSA Prototype championship for Acura Team Penske with a fourth-place finish. In total, Montoya and Cameron shared three wins and seven podiums from 10 races, winning at Mid-Ohio, Belle Isle, and Laguna Seca.

2020 season
For 2020 Montoya and Cameron would again improve at Daytona and Sebring, finishing just outside the podium places in each race. Montoya finished down the order at Road America, after being rear-ended by another entry during harsh rains while on-track. Montoya and Cameron also had an incident-filled race during the following round at Road Atlanta. Cameron spun on cold tires during the rolling race start and so began the race at a disadvantage. Montoya was later rear-ended during the final round of pit-stops by Ryan Briscoe, and then suffered a collision with another entry while navigating a pass through the esses.

Montoya would also, as a last-minute replacement for fellow IMSA Prototype driver Pipo Derani, contest his second 24 Hours of Le Mans. This time he would drive the No. 21 Dragonspeed USA Oreca-07 LMP2 entry, sharing a seat with Memo Rojas and Timothé Buret.

2021 season
Montoya participated with the Acura Team in the 24h of Daytona. The team qualified fourth and finished 4th in the race 54.418 seconds behind the winner.

2022 season
For 2022, Montoya announced he would be racing in the IMSA SportsCar Championship for DragonSpeed in the LMP2 class. His first race of the season was at Sebring, where he raced alongside his son. The car retired after Juan Pablo was involved in a multi car collision shortly after taking the wheel from his son at hour three, at which point they were leading their class. Success was achieved with a third place at Laguna Seca, before taking victory at Mid-Ohio in May.

Helmet design
Montoya's helmet was silver (or white) with red and blue arrow designs on the sides with yellow lines on the arrows' center and the yellow mouthplate area. The Formula Smiles Foundation held a yearly competition for Colombian children to design a helmet for Montoya to use in the Brazilian Grand Prix between 2002 and 2005. The winning entrant travelled to the Grand Prix as a guest of Montoya, and the helmets were auctioned off for the Foundation. At Penske, he would change the colors to match the car's sponsor, rather than his traditional Colombian national colors, as is required for all Penske drivers, while keeping the arrow design.

Legal issues

In early November 2013, the Internal Revenue Service stated that Montoya owed $2.7 million USD due to disallowed deductions from 2007 and 2008. Montoya stated that he had earned $800,000 over his reported income, but filed a challenge to the audit in U.S. Tax Court.

Personal life
Montoya builds and flies radio-controlled aircraft in his spare time. He is the father of racing driver Sebastián Montoya.

Motorsport career results

References

External links

News videos and results of Juan Pablo Montoya
The Greatest 33
Greatest 33 Profile

1975 births
24 Hours of Daytona drivers
24 Hours of Le Mans drivers
ARCA Menards Series drivers
Barber Pro Series drivers
British Formula Three Championship drivers
Champ Car champions
Champ Car drivers
Colombian Formula One drivers
Colombian people of Spanish descent
Colombian racing drivers
Formula One race winners
Indianapolis 500 drivers
Indianapolis 500 Rookies of the Year
Indianapolis 500 winners
IndyCar Series drivers
Colombian IndyCar Series drivers
International Formula 3000 Champions
International Formula 3000 drivers
Laureus World Sports Awards winners
Living people
McLaren Formula One drivers
NASCAR drivers
Rolex Sports Car Series drivers
Sportspeople from Bogotá
Williams Formula One drivers
WeatherTech SportsCar Championship drivers
Paul Stewart Racing drivers
Fortec Motorsport drivers
RSM Marko drivers
Super Nova Racing drivers
Chip Ganassi Racing drivers
Team Penske drivers
United Autosports drivers
Arrow McLaren SP drivers
Meyer Shank Racing drivers
DragonSpeed drivers
Mercedes-AMG Motorsport drivers